State Highway 90 (SH 90) is a  long state highway at the western edge of Colorado. SH 90's western terminus is a continuation as Utah State Route 46 (SR-46) at the Utah state border, and the eastern terminus is at U.S. Route 550 (US 550) in Montrose.

Route description

SH 90 begins in the west at the border with Utah where it becomes Utah State Route 46 which continues westward to meet US 191 about twenty miles (32 km) south of Moab, UT. From the Utah border the road passes eastward for about  through a very remote area, first along a section of La Sal Creek, then over a pass and though Paradox Valley, where it crosses the Dolores River Bridge near the town of Bedrock. After leaving the valley, it joins up with SH 141 at Vancorum where this portion of the road ends. The road then reappears approximately eight miles west of Montrose and travels into downtown Montrose where its western end occurs at its intersection with US 550. The two sections of the road are joined by a  section composed mostly of unpaved road and a brief stretch of SH 141, neither of which are officially part of SH 90. If only paved routes are used, that distance increases considerably.

History
The route was established in the 1920s without the current gap. In 1954, all was cut out except the current eastern section, and the current western section was added back in 1963. The route was also entirely paved by 1963.

Major intersections

References

External links

090
Montrose, Colorado
Transportation in Montrose County, Colorado